Little Johnny may refer to:

Little Johnny, the fictional subject of a genre of jokes.
Little Johnny Jones, a musical
Little Johnny Sheep-Dung, a French fairy tale

People

Little Johnny Jones (pianist) (1924–1964). Chicago blues pianist and singer.
John Howard (born 1939), the 25th Prime Minister of Australia. Colloquially known as Little Johnny.
Little Johnny Taylor (1943–2002), an American blues and soul singer

Animals

Littlejohn's Tree Frog, Litoria littlejohni
Littlejohn's Toadlet, Uperoleia littlejohni